Atabak Zarei (born March 1997) is an Iranian professional footballer who plays for Machine Sazi in the Persian Gulf Pro League.

External links
 Atabak Zarei at IranLeague
 

Iranian footballers
1997 births
Sportspeople from Tabriz
Living people
Machine Sazi F.C. players
Shahrdari Tabriz players
Association football midfielders